is a Japanese children's illustrated book series created by Q-LiA and illustrated by Ritsuko Gibo, which started in 2003. An anime adaptation, Pururun! Shizuku-chan, was produced by TMS Entertainment and debuted on TV Tokyo on October 7, 2006. A second season called Pururun! Shizuku chan Aha debuted one year later in 2007.

A second series, Picchipichi Shizuku-chan, ran from October 2012 to September 2013. It was produced by Asahi Production and was broadcast on three Japanese Association of Independent Television Stations members and Kids Station.

Plot
The series revolves around a playful young child named Shizuku-chan. He, alongside his schoolmates, friends, and family lives a life of dangerous adventures in the Shizuku Forest.

Characters
 Shizuku (しずくちゃん): The main character of the series. Being a raindrop sprite, Shizuku was born as a drop from rain for a cloud. He is named after his home, the Shizuku Forest. Rain fills Shizuku with happiness, causing rainbows to originate from his forehead. Shizuku is Japanese for "a drop of rain" which revolves around his birth. His birthday is on April 29. Voiced by: Miyako Ito
 Uruoi (うるおいちゃん): The female main character of the series. She is the pink lemonade sprite in some manga, but is originally the skin lotion sprite of the Shizuku Forest. She is one of Shizuku's closest friends. She has a crush on her friend, Shizuku which is proven throughout the series (such as Shizuku freezing within ice and could have only been thawed by being kissed from only Uruoi alone). She wears a bow on her head. Being fashionable, she and her family run and live in the Department Store of Shizuku Forest. Voiced by: Ryoka Yuzuki
 Mirumiru (Milmil) (みるみるちゃん): The youngest of Shizuku's friends. He is a milk sprite who, unlike an infant, carries a large amount of strength. He is also known to outgrow his older friend, Shizuku. He wears a bib with the word "milk" printed on it. He and his family run and live in the Milk Store of Shizuku Forest. Because he's very little, he only says "nyu" ("latte" in the Italian dub.) Voiced by: Sayaka Narita
 Hanatare (はなたれ君): He is a nasal-mucus sprite.
 Hanaji (はなぢ君): He is a nosebleed sprite. Voiced by: Rikako Aikawa
 Aseo (アセオ君): A fat young yellow sweat sprite. He is known to overeat and to have the ability to sweat buckets. Among many, his most favorite food is curry. He and his family lives in and runs the Sauna of the Shizuku Forest. Voiced by: Yasuhiko Kawazu
 Namida (なみだ君): He is a tears sprite. Passionate and very weepy. He runs Sports-gym with an athlete. Voiced by: Makoto Ishii
 Elder Sister Shampoo & Elder Sister Rinse (シャンプー姉さん＆リンス姉さん) They are a Shampoo & Rinse sprite, respectively. They are twins and Uruoi-Chan's elder sisters. They both run a beauty salon.
 Dororon (どろろん): The prankster of Shizuku-chan's friends but they still love him. Being a mischievous mud-sprite, he is known to fling mud at his pranking victims. Voiced by: Rie Ichita
 Midoriko (みどりこさん): The green sister of the Tea Sprites. She, alongside her sisters, runs and lives in the "Cafe-Drop" of the Shizuku Forest. She is the tea maker and server of the Cafe. She is known to be very polite yet have a strange personality. She wears a flower on her hair and drinking tea creates a long stick-like substance on her forehead. She fights with naginata. Voiced by: Naomi Shindou
 Longlong (ロンロン): The brown sister of the Tea Sprites. She carries much power and ability. She fights with nunchucks. Voiced by: Akiko Yajima
 Letty (レティ): The red sister of the Tea Sprites. She cooks the food of the Shizuku Forest's Cafe. She fights with frying pans.
 Colon (コロン君): The Eau-de-Cologne Sprite. He is very attractive to women, making him the "pretty and handsome boy" of Shizuku Forest.
 Mineo (ミネ夫君): He is a mineral water sprite.
 Honey  (ハニーちゃん): She is a Honey  syrup sprite.
 Yodare  (ヨダレ君): He is a slobber sprite.
 Aroma  (アロマさん) He is an Aroma-oil sprite.
 Ponshu  (ポンシュさん) He is a Sake sprite and an Enka singer.
 Monsieur-Vino(ヴィーノ氏): He is a red wine sprite. He has swirled left eye and twinkle in the other, a bow, and hat.
 Rosé (ロゼちゃん) She is a Rosé wine sprite. Monsieur-Vino & Madam-Blanche's daughter. Voiced by: Momoko Saito
 Madam-Blanche (マダム・ブランシュ) She is a white wine sprite.
 Tsumurin (つむりん): One of Shizuku-chan's best friends. He is a snail. Voiced by: Masashito Yabe
 Ametarou (雨太郎): Shizuku-chan's father. Voiced by: Takeharu Onishi
 Rainy (レイニー): Shizuku-chan's mother. Voiced by: Yuko Kobayashi
 Miku-chan (ミクちゃん): A human girl introduced in Picchipichi Shizuku-chan who visits Shizuku-chan's world from Earth.

Media
Merchandise based on Pururun! Shizuku-chan! includes CDs such as Shizuku no Mori kara Konnichi wa, released on November 22, 2006, and a second one on January 24, 2007 named Shizuku no Mori no Ongakukai Purun!. A picture book that carries both CDs was released on February 21, 2007 and a second was released on March 28, 2007. A third CD was released on April 18, 2007. The fifth and sixth were released on April 18, 2007.

There were three games released for the Nintendo DS, one for Pururun! Shizuku-chan and two more for Pururun! Shizuku-chan Aha!. Additionally, Sega released various toys based on the series.

References

External links

 Anime official website 
 Pururun! Shizuku-chan at TV Tokyo's website 

Book series introduced in 2003
2003 manga
2006 anime television series debuts
2007 anime television series debuts
2012 anime television series debuts
Asahi Production
Japanese children's animated comedy television series
Surreal comedy anime and manga
TMS Entertainment
TV Tokyo original programming